Mirella Gregori (born 7 October 1967) mysteriously disappeared from Rome on 7 May 1983, about forty days before the disappearance of Emanuela Orlandi, a citizen of Vatican City. Both vanishings are unsolved as of today.

International events
Both the Gregori and the Orlandi cases led to the Grey Wolves, an extremist Turkish group, claiming to be involved in the abductions and demanding the release of Mehmet Ali Ağca, the assassin who shot and wounded Pope John Paul II in Saint Peter's Square on 13 May 1981. According to Mehmet Ali Ağca's autobiography, the two girls' disappearances as well as the disappearance of Soviet journalist Oleg G. Bitov from the Venice Film Festival on 9 September that same year are closely linked.

Circumstances of disappearance
Gregori left her house after receiving an apparent call from a classmate called "Alessandro", she then told her mother she would meet with the classmate outside and would be back in 10 minutes. That was the last time she was seen.

Suspects
During a visit of the Pope to a Rome parish, on 15 December 1985, Gregori's mother recognized a man in the papal escort as the person who often came to pick up her daughter at the house. The man was identified as Raoul Bonarelli.

Roman remains
Remains found in Rome in October 2018 were thought to possibly be those of Mirella or Emanuela Orlandi. Early reports said the remains could be those of a woman, but results of tests released on 1 February 2019 showed they were of an ancient Roman man who died between 190 and 230 AD.

See also 
Banda della Magliana
 Grey Wolves member Mehmet Ali Agca's 1981 attempt to assassinate the Pope
 List of people who disappeared

References

External links
 Mirella Gregori
 Pubblinetsicilia

1967 births
1980s in Rome
1980s missing person cases
1983 in Italy
1983 crimes in Italy
Missing Italian children
Missing person cases in Italy
Modern history of Italy
Possibly living people